Fuego (1981) is Menudo's seventh Spanish album.

This album was released with two different covers and titles.  The first release was titled Menudo featuring brothers Oscar and Ricky Meléndez, René Farrait,  Johnny Lozada and Xavier Serbiá.  This is the second album this line-up recorded together.  The second release was titled Fuego featuring new member Miguel Cancel.  Miguel replaced Óscar Meléndez after Óscar reached the age limit. Both albums contain the same songs.

Track listing
 Fuego - Singer: group
 El Momento Del Adiós - Singer: Johnny Lozada
 Doña Tecla - Singer: Oscar Meléndez and Ricky Meléndez
 Madre - Singer: René Farrait
 Llegas Tú - Singer:  group
 A Bailar - Singer: René Farrait
 El Ayer - Singer: René Farrait
 Isole - Singer:  group
 De Tu Vuelo - Singer:  group
 Sueños - Singer: René Farrait
 Ella A-A - Singer: group
 El Pavo Real - Singer: René Farrait

References

Menudo (band) albums
1981 albums